The Philippine Canoe Kayak Dragonboat Federation, Inc. (PCKDF) is the national governing body for the sports of Canoe, Kayak and Dragon boat in the Philippines.

It is accredited by the International Canoe Federation which is the governing body for the sport of Canoe in the world and by the Philippine Olympic Committee and the Philippine Sports Commission. Teresita Uy is the current president of the PCKF.

External links
Philippine Canoe-Kayak Federation profile at the Philippine Olympic Committee website

Philippines
Philippines
Canoeing in the Philippines
Canoe Kayak
Dragon boat racing in the Philippines